The 2023 San Miguel Corporation (SMC) - Philippine Sportswriters Association (PSA) Annual Awards was an annual awarding ceremony honoring the individuals (athletes, teams, officials and organizations) and organizations that made a significant impact to Philippine sports in 2022.

The awarding ceremony was held at the March 6, 2023, at the Grand Ballroom of the Diamond Hotel in Manila. More than 100 sports personalities and entities will be bestowed in the awarding ceremony, highlighted by the crowing of Athlete of the Year to World Championships gold medalist Hidilyn Diaz.

Philippine Sports Commission Chairman Richard "Dickie" Bachmann and Philippine Olympic Committee President Abraham "Bambol" Tolentino has been invited to witness the affair, while Project: Gintong Alay Director and Laoag, Ilocos Norte Mayor Michael Marcos Keon will serve as a guest speaker.

The PSA, currently headed by its president, Rey Lachica, sports editor of Tempo, is the oldest Philippine-based media group established in 1949 and the membership is composed of sportswriters, sports reporters, sports editors, columnists from the Philippine-based broadsheets, tabloids, online sports websites, and broadcast media.

Honor roll

Main awards
The following are the list of main awards of the event.

Athlete of the Year

This year's PSA Awards will highlight the recognition of the PSA Athlete of the Year to Hidilyn Diaz, who won her second straight Athete of the Year accolade and fourth overall title (2016, 2018, 2021) anew.

The PSA unanimously voted Diaz for the Athlete of the Year award after she notched a triple gold medal sweep in the women's 55 kg category at the 2022 World Weightlifting Championships held in Bogota, Colombia from December 5-16, 2022.

Her triple gold medal win completes Diaz's gold medal collection including the gold in the 2020 Summer Olympics, Southeast Asian Games, Asian Weightlifting Championships and Asian Games.

Main awardees

Major awardees

Citations

2021 Southeast Asian Games gold medalists

These are the gold medalists from the 2021 Southeast Asian Games in Hanoi, Vietnam who will receive the citations from the PSA. Other gold medalists who have received another award will not be included.

Kurt Barbosa (Taekwondo)
Pia Bidaure, Abby Bidaure and Phoebe Amistoso (Archery)
Clinton Bautista (Athletics - Hurdles)
Ian Clark Bautista (Boxing)
Islay Erika Bomogao and Richein Yozorez (Muay Thai)
Fernando Casares (Triathlon)
Eric Cray (Athletics - Hurdles)
Samantha Catantan (Fencing)
Phillip Delarmino (Muay Thai)
Aleah Finnegan (Gymnastics)
Jack Escarpe (Kurash)
Rena Furukawa (Judo)
Treat Huey and Ruben Gonzales (Tennis)
Gina Iniong (Kickboxing)
Chloe Isleta (Swimming)
Rogen Ladon (Boxing)
Kim Mangrobang (Triathlon)
Eumir Marcial (Boxing)
William Morrison (Athletics - Shot Put)
Shugen Nakano (Judo)
Jocel Ninobla (Taekwondo)
Francine Padios (Pencak Silat)
Annie Ramirez (Jiu-Jitsu)
Kayla Richardson (Athletics - Dash)
Jean Claude Saclag (Kickboxing)
Merwin Tan (Bowling)
Agatha Wong (Wushu)
 Philippine women's artistic gymnastics team
Aleah Finnegan, Chiara Andrew, Charlie Manzano, Lucia Gutierrez, Kursten Lopez, Ma. Cristina Onofre-Loberanes 
 Philippine dancesport team
Sean Aranar and Ana Nualla, Angelo Marquez and Stephanie Sabalo, Mark Gayon and Joy Renigen
 Philippine men's bowling team
Ivan Dychangco, Ivan Malig, Merwin Tan, Patrick Nuqui
 Philippine women's League of Legends: Wildrift team
Charize "Yugen" Doble, Giana "Jeeya" Llanes, Angel "Angelailaila" Lozada, Christine "Rayray" Navidad, Rose Ann "Hell Girl" Robles, April "Aeae" Sotto
 Philippine Mobile Legends: Bang Bang team
Kyle Dominic "Dominic" Soto, Danerie James "Wise" Del Rosario, Salic Alauya "Hadji" Imam, Lee Howard "Owl" Gonzales, Johnmar "OhMyV33NUS" Villaluna, Dexter Louise Cruz "Dexstar" Alaba, Russel Aaron "Eyon" Usi
 Philippine women's basketball team
Mai-loni Henson, Afril Bernardino, Janine Pontejos, Clare Castro, Khate Castillo, Ella Fajardo, Chack Cabinbin, Andrea Tongco, Gemma Miranda, Camille Clarin, Angel Surada, Kristine Cayabyab, Katrina Guytingco, Mikka Cacho, Karl Ann Pingol, Monique del Carmen

Others

Tony Siddayao Awards for Junior Athletes and Milo Junior Athletes of the Year
The award, which is named after Tony Siddayao (deceased, former sports editor of Manila Standard) is given out to outstanding junior national athletes aged 17 and below.

The awardees will also brought home the Junior Athletes of the Year award and medals from Milo Philippines.

Posthumous honors
The PSA, will offer a tribute to the sports personalities who died in 2022 through a one minute of silent prayer.

Raul Alcoseba (Basketball)
Joe Antonio (Sportswriting)
Malou Aquino-Manuel (Sportswriting)
Jacinto Chua (Basketball)
Rudy Fernandez (Para-Triathlon)
Ernie Gonzales (Sportswriting)
Dick Ildefonso (Sportscasting)
Lydia de Vega-Mercado (Athletics)
Valerio Lopez (Basketball)
Peter Paul Patrick Lucas (Sportscasting)
Cyrus Mann (Basketball)
Zaldy Perez (Sportswriting)
Adriano "Dong" Polistico (Basketball)
Maoi Roca (Basketball)
Boyet Sison (Sportscasting)
Eric Suguitan (Basketball)
Johanna Uy (Underwater Hockey)

See also
2022 in Philippine sports

References

PSA
PSA